The twenty-fifth series of the British medical drama television series Casualty commenced airing in the United Kingdom on BBC One on 4 September 2010 and concluded on 6 August 2011. The series featured several crossovers with spin-off show Holby City.

This series has featured the death of Polly Emmerson (Sophia Di Martino), and the departures of Adam Trueman (Tristan Gemmill), Yuki Reid (Will Sharpe), and Kirsty Clements (Lucy Gaskell). This series has welcomed Dylan Keogh (William Beck) and Madiha "Mads" Durrani (Hasina Haque), with the latter departing at the end of the series; and has seen the return of Linda Andrews (Christine Tremarco).

Cast

Overview 
Jaye Jacobs will guest-star as her Holby City character Donna Jackson in the opening episode, as part of Kent's plan to have characters from the two shows cross-over several times a year. While Jacobs has appeared in several Casualty@Holby City episodes, she had never before appeared in Casualty itself, and deemed the two shows very different, to the extent that it felt like "doing a completely different job". In terms of her character's development, Jacobs stated that "Donna really has to put herself on the line in this episode and its not something she's used to doing", explaining that now she has her orphaned niece to care for her priorities have changed: "She's had to accept some responsibility and it's not now just about which man she's going to sleep with next". Guy Henry guest-starred as his Holby City character Henrik Hanssen in episode 24. The character had only recently joined the Holby City cast as the hospital's chief executive officer.

Hasina Haque joined the Casualty cast as new staff nurse, Madiha "Mads" Durrani in episode 1. Mads' storylines included: an attraction to Lenny Lyons and being raped by her taxi driver. She left in the episode 47, the series' finale. Cheryl Campbell joined the cast for ten episodes as the new joint clinical lead, Miriam Turner, in episode 25. Miriam fought against Nick for the sole clinical lead position, which she won. However, she then decided to return the position to Nick and left the show in episode 35. New trust doctor, Dylan Keogh (William Beck) arrived in episode 28 to replace Ruth following her sectioning in episode 21. Ruth returned to the ED as a doctor in episode 45, but Dylan continued to appear. Former Waterloo Road star, Christine Tremarco who guest-starred in the previous series as Jessica Harrison's (Gillian Kearney) friend, Linda Andrews returned to the show in episode 38 as the new clinical nurse manager, replacing Tess Bateman (Suzanne Packer), who returned to her former position as ward sister. However, in the series finale, Linda chooses to resign from clinical nurse manager and accept a staff nurse position with Tess taking the role back from Linda.

The series also saw a number of departures. Junior doctor, Yuki Reid (Will Sharpe), left the show in episode 16 after taking the blame for Lenny and deciding to take a research position in Birmingham. Sophia Di Martino, who plays ambulance technician, Polly Emmerson left the series in January 2011, with Polly's exit scenes airing in episode 34. Polly, who was to leave the following day for a new career path, decided to fix things between Dylan and an unhinged patient. Unfortunately, the patient is armed with scissors and is stabbed. In a tense episode, Polly bleeds to death, leaving the department devastated and Dylan feeling guilty. Lucy Gaskell, who plays Kirsty Clements, became pregnant, but rather than take maternity leave, decided to leave the show. Kirsty's exit aired in episode 46 when a patient encourages her to make a decision about her future and she chooses to leave Holby with daughter, Nita and live in Wales. In the series finale, Adam Trueman (Tristan Gemmill) left after a tough few weeks, marking the end of his four-year stint on the show.

Main characters 

Matt Bardock as Jeff Collier
William Beck as Dylan Keogh (from episode 28)
Charles Dale as Big Mac
Sophia Di Martino as Polly Emmerson (until episode 34)
Michael French as Nick Jordan
Lucy Gaskell as Kirsty Clements (until episode 46)
Tristan Gemmill as Adam Trueman (until episode 47)
Hasina Haque as Madiha "Mads" Durrani (episodes 1−47)
Jane Hazlegrove as Kathleen "Dixie" Dixon
Tony Marshall as Noel Garcia
Steven Miller as Lenny Lyons
Suzanne Packer as Tess Bateman
Sunetra Sarker as Zoe Hanna
Will Sharpe as Yuki Reid (until episode 16)
Georgia Taylor as Ruth Winters
Derek Thompson as Charlie Fairhead
Christine Tremarco as Linda Andrews (from episode 38)
Ben Turner as Jay Faldren

Recurring characters 

Stephen Billington as Edward Thurlow (until episode 17)
Tom Chadbon as Henry Williams (until episode 37)
Holly Earl as Nita Clements (episodes 7−46)
Stephen Lord as Warren Clements (episodes 7−25 and 33)

Guest characters 

Cheryl Campbell as Miriam Turner (episodes 25−35)
Michelle Collins as Camille Lewis (episodes 1−7)
Guy Henry as Henrik Hanssen (episodes 24, 25, 29, 34 and 35)
Jaye Jacobs as Donna Jackson (episode 1)
Travis Oliver as James Molloy (episodes 8, 11 and 17)

Crew

For Series 25, Oliver Kent continued in his ongoing role as the show's Series Producer with Belinda Campbell continuing as the show's Executive Producer until Episode 45. Johnathan Young, former Executive Producer of The Bill, took over as Executive Producer from the final two episodes of the show (Episodes 46-47). Mark Catley, the show's writer, continued as the show's Consultant Producer.

For this series, the storylines were written by four of the show's writers: Ellen Taylor wrote the storylines for episodes 1-11; Paul Logue (Episodes 12-22), Sasha Hails (Episodes 23-35) & Hamish Wright (Episode 36-47). There was no Story Producer credited for this series.

Episodes

Critical response
The series premiere was selected as recommended viewing by What's on TV, who deemed the episode "compelling". Jane Rackham of the Radio Times praised the episode, advising viewers not to be deterred by the "choppy editing" and hand-held camerawork, commenting that it ultimately "meshes together rather well." Rackham's only complaint was the unprofessional behaviour exhibited by Lenny, which she felt "beggar[ed] belief at times".

The critical response to many episodes on the holby.tv forums has been extremely critical, with many viewers complaining that Casualty is too storyline-based and that there is very little realism or medical procedure discussed in the show anymore.

Notes

References
General

 BBC One - Casualty, Series 25
 

Specific

External links
 Casualty series 25 at the Internet Movie Database

25
2010 British television seasons
2011 British television seasons